Hindsight (lit. Blue Salt) is a 2011 South Korean action drama film by Lee Hyun-seung, his first after a ten-year hiatus. The film is about a hitwoman who struggles with her feelings for the underworld boss who is her target. The film deals with issues of age difference, and the Korean underworld. It stars Song Kang-ho and Shin Se-kyung, and premiered at the 16th Busan International Film Festival. The film received a total of 763,776 admissions nationwide.

Plot
Busan, South Korea, the present day. Legendary retired gangster Yoon Doo-hun (Song Kang-ho) dreams of opening a restaurant, and enrolls in a cooking class, where he gets to know Jo Se-bin (Shin Se-kyung). Doo-hun then hears that his former boss, Man-gil, has died after being hit by a car; the gang's members need to find Man-gil's will to see whom he nominated as his successor, though most of them expect it is Doo-hun. Meanwhile, Se-bin's roommate Lee Eun-jung (Esom) has become indebted to some Haeundae moneylenders, who force Se-bin, in return, to spy on Doo-hun. After Eun-jung steals a suitcase containing cocaine from the moneylenders, Se-bin is ordered to kill Doo-hun but can't bring herself to do it. Instead, Eun-jung tries to run him over with a car and subsequently disappears. Doo-hun survives and takes over as head of his old gang, intent on discovering who killed Man-gil. Among various problems, he has to contend with Baek Kyung-min (Lee Jong-hyuk), an ambitious young member of the gang, and his continuing relationship with Se-bin, who is under pressure from assassination agency head Madame Kang (Youn Yuh-jung) to kill him.

Cast

 Song Kang-ho ... Yoon Doo-hun - a retired gangster
 Shin Se-kyung ... Jo Se-bin -  a young national shooting athlete-turned-assassin
 Chun Jung-myung ... Ae-gu - Doo-hun's right-hand man
 Lee Jong-hyuk ... Baek Kyung-min - Doo-hun's friend and rival
 Kim Min-jun ... K - another assassin hired to kill Doo-hun
 Youn Yuh-jung ... Madame Kang
 Lee Geung-young ... Choi Go-mun
 Kim Roi-ha ...	Kim Gi-chul
 Oh Dal-su ... Teacher Yook
 Esom ... Lee Eun-jung - Se-bin's best friend and cooking partner
 Jang Young-nam ... culinary school instructor
Kim Jong-gu ... gang boss Du
Kim Kang-woo ... gang boss Kim
Jo Young-jin ... gang boss Ki
Jo Deok-je ... gang boss Ri
Choi Deok-moon ... Haeundae gang boss
Yang Ki-won ... Haeundae gang deputy
Lee Jong-pil ... Yong-soo
Jin Yang-hye ... news announcer

References

External links
  
 
 
 

2011 films
2011 action drama films
2011 crime action films
2011 crime drama films
Films about organized crime in South Korea
Films set in Busan
Films shot in Busan
2010s Korean-language films
South Korean crime action films
South Korean crime drama films
South Korean action drama films
Films shot in the Philippines
CJ Entertainment films
2010s South Korean films